Cardozo High School can refer to:
Benjamin N. Cardozo High School in New York City.
Cardozo Education Campus, formerly Cardozo Senior High School in Washington, D.C.